The Buckinghamshire County Museum is a museum in the centre of Aylesbury, in Buckinghamshire, England.  It displays artefacts pertinent to the history of Buckinghamshire including geological displays, costume, agriculture and industry.  The museum also features changing art exhibits in the Buckinghamshire Art Gallery.

The museum is housed in three old buildings that have been joined together: a chapel in St Mary's Square, the old Aylesbury Grammar School (before it was moved to its present location) and Ceely House.

To the rear of the building, in what used to be Ceely House's coach house, is the Roald Dahl Children's Gallery.

References

External links 
 Museum website

Aylesbury
History of Buckinghamshire
Art museums and galleries in Buckinghamshire
Local museums in Buckinghamshire